The cyber defamation law (사이버 모욕죄) is a legislation in South Korea which refers to libel or slander that is expressed online, typically via a publicly accessible website. Cyber defamation often falls under the scope of existing libel and slander laws in most jurisdictions and is typically treated as a tort as opposed to a crime.

Overview 
The cyber defamation law that the South Korean government pursues allows police to crack down on hateful comments without any reports from victims.

The Korea Communications Commission (KCC), South Korea's telecommunications and broadcasting regulator, has been considering revising the current Telecommunications Law and put more regulations and deeper scrutiny on major Internet portals.

Controversies 
There have been talks about introducing the stricter laws in cyberspace. A famous celebrity's suicide in South Korea, triggered the controversies once again as to whether such law is necessary. The law supported by the governing Grand National Party (GNP), if implemented, will allow police to investigate the cyber defamation cases without any complaints of the victims. The opposition Democratic Party has been against the introduction of such law.

Advocate views 
 The current laws have failed to prevent the number of the victims from increasing at an escalating rate.
 Freedom of speech comes with responsibility.
 Because information and rumors can travel in a matter of seconds across the Internet, cyber-bullying and cyber defamation could take a significant toll on each victim without such strict regulations by authorities.

Opposing views 
 There are already ways to regulate the cyberspace with the current laws.
 It is potentially possible for the law to be exploited by authorities in an attempt to crack down on people who express opposite views.
 Such law might cause a harmful effect on freedom of speech.
 "Defamation" is too ambiguous to be defined by a third party, other than the victims.

Survey 
A Research & Research survey of 800 Korean people conducted on Jan. 14, 2009 showed that 60% supported the GNP-led bill dealing with cyber defamation, and 32.1% opposed it.

Celebrities' suicide 
Some Korean celebrities have suffered from severe depression, caused in part by malicious online comments, before committing suicide.
Lee Eun-ju
Jung Da Bin
U;Nee
 Choi Jin-sil
Sulli
Goo Hara

Online gaming 
Vast majority of cyber defamation police reports arise from online games. League of Legends is a game which is notorious for such acts. In 2015 alone, South Korean law enforcement received and investigated over 8000 reports of cyber defamation; over half of these cases involve League of Legends where players head to police stations as a retaliation after being verbally abused by teammates or opponents.

There are even 'settlement fee hunters', where players enter games and grief with intention of being insulted by other players. In some cases, such settlement fee hunters file police reports against over 50 other individuals at once. Most of the victims of settlement fee hunters are teenagers, since many parents are willing to pay settlement fees ranging from 300 thousand to 2 million KRW (300 to 2000 USD) to avoid their children having to go to trial and risk gaining criminal records.

See also 

 Cyberbullying legislation
 Cyberstalking legislation
 Internet censorship in South Korea
 Political libel
 Strategic lawsuit against public participation

References

Computer law
Defamation
Human rights abuses in South Korea
Law of South Korea